Notes on a Scandal is a 2006 British psychological thriller-drama film directed by Richard Eyre and produced by Robert Fox and Scott Rudin. Adapted from the 2003 novel of the same name by Zoë Heller, the screenplay was written by Patrick Marber. The film stars Judi Dench and Cate Blanchett and centres on a lonely veteran teacher who uncovers a fellow teacher's illicit affair with an underage student.

It was nominated for four Academy Awards – Best Actress, Best Supporting Actress, Best Adapted Screenplay, and Best Original Score.

Plot
Barbara Covett is a history teacher at a comprehensive school in London. Having never married and nearing retirement, she has contempt for her students and fellow teachers. Her only comfort is her diary. When a new art teacher, Sheba Hart, joins the staff, Barbara is immediately attracted to her and they strike up a friendship. In Barbara, this friendship quickly turns into infatuation and obsession. Sheba is married to the much older Richard, and is just re-entering the work force after devoting herself to her special needs son.

Barbara later witnesses Sheba in a sexual encounter with a 15-year-old student named Steven Connolly at the school. When Barbara confronts her, Sheba recounts all the details of her involvement with the boy, but asks Barbara not to tell the school administration until after Christmas, as she wants to be with her family. Barbara claims she has no intention of reporting her providing Sheba ends the relationship immediately, but Barbara secretly plans to use the affair as a means of manipulating Sheba. Over the Christmas break, Barbara visits her sister, who asks her about another young teacher Barbara befriended. Barbara stiffly says that the young teacher moved away. Barbara's sister asks if she has any other female "friends", strongly implying Barbara is a  lesbian; Barbara insists she has no idea what her sister is talking about.

Sheba tells Steven that the affair is over yet finds herself unable to stop seeing him. However, when she refuses to give in to Barbara's increasing demands on her time and attention, Barbara reveals the secret to a male teacher who has told her that he is attracted to Sheba. The teacher informs the student's parents and the school. After the affair becomes public, the head teacher accuses Barbara of knowing about the affair and not notifying the authorities. He also learns that a former teacher at the school, the young woman Barbara mentioned at Christmas, had taken out a restraining order against Barbara for stalking her and her fiancé. Both Sheba and Barbara are fired.

Sheba's husband asks her to move out of their home, so she moves into Barbara's house, unaware that Barbara is the reason she was found out and believing the affair became known because Steven confessed it to his mother.  When Sheba discovers Barbara's diary and learns it was Barbara who leaked the story of the affair, she confronts Barbara and strikes her in anger. A row ensues, and Sheba runs outside to a crowd of reporters and photographers. When she becomes hemmed in by them, Barbara rescues her.

Sheba's emotions spent, she quietly tells Barbara that she had initiated the friendship with her because she liked her and that they could have been friends. Barbara says, "I need more than a friend". Sheba leaves Barbara, placing the journal on the table as a mute reminder that she had kept its contents secret, and returns to her husband. Sheba is subsequently sentenced to 10 months in prison, however, it is strongly implied she reconciled with her family.

Later, Barbara meets another younger woman who is reading a newspaper about the Sheba Hart affair. Barbara says she was acquainted with Sheba but says they hardly knew each other. Barbara introduces herself, invites the other woman to a concert, and the pair continue to talk.

Cast

 Judi Dench as Barbara Covett
 Cate Blanchett as Sheba Hart
 Bill Nighy as Richard Hart
 Andrew Simpson as Steven Connolly
 Tom Georgeson as Ted Mawson
 Michael Maloney as Sandy Pabblem
 Joanna Scanlan as Sue Hodge
 Shaun Parkes as Bill Rumer
 Emma Williams as Linda
 Phil Davis as Brian Bangs
 Juno Temple as Polly Hart
 Max Lewis as Ben Hart
 Anne-Marie Duff as Annabel
 Julia McKenzie as Marjorie

Filming
Filming took place in August and September 2005. The film was mainly shot on location in the Parliament Hill, Gospel Oak and Camden Town areas of northwest London. The Arts and Media School, Islington was used a film location for many of the school scenes.

Reception

Critical reaction
The film opened to generally positive reviews, with Blanchett and Dench receiving critical acclaim for their performances. The website's critical consensus states, "In this sharp psychological thriller, Judi Dench and Cate Blanchett give fierce, memorable performances as two schoolteachers locked in a battle of wits." Metacritic assigned the film a weighted average score of 73 out of 100, based on 35 critics, indicating "generally favorable reviews".

The Guardian called the film a "delectable adaptation" with "tremendous acting from Judi Dench and Cate Blanchett, with many blue-chip supporting contributions and a "screenwriting masterclass from Patrick Marber". The Times praised the film, saying: "Notes on a Scandal, is screenwriting at its vicious best... Richard Eyre directs the film like a chamber play. He leans on Philip Glass's ever-present and insistent music like a crutch. But his natural gift for framing scenes is terrifically assured. A potent and evil pleasure."

American publications also gave the film acclaim, with the Los Angeles Times describing the film as "Sexy, aspirational and post-politically correct, Notes on a Scandal could turn out to be the Fatal Attraction of the noughties." The Washington Post noted the "dark brilliance" and that it "offers what is possibly the only intelligent account of such a disaster ever constructed, with a point of view that is somewhat gimlet-eyed and offered with absolutely no sentimentality whatsoever." The reviewer also identified the film as a "study in the anthropology of British liberal-left middle-class life." Chicago Sun-Times film critic Richard Roeper heaped praise on the film: "Perhaps the most impressive acting duo in any film of 2006. Dench and Blanchett are magnificent. Notes on a Scandal is whip-smart, sharp and grown up."

However, the Houston Chronicle criticized the film as a melodrama, saying, "[d]ramatic overstatement saturates just about every piece of this production".

Commercial
The film grossed $49,752,391 worldwide, against a budget of $15 million.

Soundtrack

The original score for the movie was composed by Philip Glass. The film also features the songs "Funky Kingston" by Toots and the Maytals and "Dizzy" by Siouxsie and the Banshees.

Awards and nominations
79th Academy Awards:
Nominated: Best Actress – Judi Dench
Nominated: Best Supporting Actress – Cate Blanchett
Nominated: Best Adapted Screenplay – Patrick Marber
Nominated: Best Original Score – Philip Glass

BAFTA Awards
Nominated: Best British Film
Nominated: Best Actress – Judi Dench
Nominated: Best Adapted Screenplay – Patrick Marber

British Independent Film Awards
Nominated: Best British Independent Film
Won: Best Performance by an Actress in a British Independent Film – Judi Dench
Nominated: Best Performance by a Supporting Actor or Actress in a British Independent Film – Cate Blanchett
Won: Best Screenplay – Patrick Marber

Broadcast Film Critics Association Awards
Nominated: Best Actress – Judi Dench
Nominated: Best Picture
Nominated: Best Supporting Actress – Cate Blanchett

Chicago Film Critics Association Awards
Nominated: Best Actress – Judi Dench
Nominated: Best Supporting Actress – Cate Blanchett
Nominated: Best Adapted Screenplay – Patrick Marber
Nominated: Best Original Score

Dallas-Fort Worth Film Critics Association Awards
Won: Best Supporting Actress – Cate Blanchett

Evening Standard British Film Awards
Won: Best Actress – Judi Dench

Florida Film Critics Circle Awards
Won: Best Supporting Actress – Cate Blanchett

Golden Globe Awards
Nominated: Best Actress in a Motion Picture, Drama – Judi Dench
Nominated: Best Supporting Actress – Cate Blanchett
Nominated: Best Screenplay – Patrick Marber

London Film Critics Circle Awards
Nominated: Actress of the Year – Judi Dench
Nominated: British Actress of the Year – Judi Dench
Nominated: British Supporting Actor of the Year – Bill Nighy

Oklahoma Film Critics Circle Awards
Won: Best Supporting Actress – Cate Blanchett

Online Film Critics Awards
Nominated: Best Actress – Judi Dench
Nominated: Best Supporting Actress – Cate Blanchett
Nominated: Best Original Score – Philip Glass

Phoenix Film Critics Society Awards
Won: Best Supporting Actress – Cate Blanchett

Screen Actors Guild Awards
Nominated: Best Actress – Judi Dench
Nominated: Best Supporting Actress – Cate Blanchett

Toronto Film Critics Association Awards
Won: Best Supporting Actress – Cate Blanchett

References

External links

 
 
 

2006 films
2006 LGBT-related films
2006 psychological thriller films
2006 thriller drama films
2000s English-language films
2000s psychological drama films
Adultery in films
British LGBT-related films
British psychological drama films
British psychological thriller films
British thriller drama films
Films about scandalous teacher–student relationships
Films about sexual repression
Films based on British novels
Films directed by Richard Eyre
Films produced by Scott Rudin
Films scored by Philip Glass
Films set in London
Films shot at Elstree Film Studios
Fox Searchlight Pictures films
Juvenile sexuality in films
Lesbian-related films
LGBT-related thriller drama films
2000s British films